Samuel Royal Thurston (April 15, 1816 – April 9, 1851) was an American pioneer, lawyer and politician. He was the first delegate from the Oregon Territory to the United States Congress and was instrumental in the passage of the Donation Land Claim Act.

Biography

Early years
Thurston was born in Monmouth, Maine, and grew up in Peru, Maine; his father died when he was young. After attending Dartmouth College, he graduated in 1843 from Bowdoin College in Maine, graduating with honors. He then studied law under Robert Dunlap, married, and moved with his wife to Iowa.

Thurston came to the Oregon Country in 1847 as an emigrant over the Oregon Trail. In Oregon he settled in Hillsboro, where he practiced law. Then in 1848 he was elected to the Provisional Legislature from Tuality District where he served with fellow Hillsboro resident David Hill. In 1849, Thurston was selected to represent the Oregon Territory in the U.S. Congress.

Political career

In the struggle for the control of Oregon lands, Thurston was an ally of Jason Lee against John McLoughlin, the chief of the Hudson's Bay Company at Fort Vancouver who Thurston, for shamefully political reasons, accused of helping thwart settlement in the territory. As Congressional delegate, Thurston authored the Donation Land Claim Act so as to give McLoughlin's HBC claim to the state legislature. Thurston and Lee made false statements about McLoughlin before the United States Supreme Court in an effort to publicly discredit him. The statements resulted in the denial of McLoughlin's land claims to his homestead in Oregon City.

Thurston's major political achievement was in helping pass the Donation Land Claim Act in 1850. The act legitimized existing land claims in the Oregon Territory and granted 640 acres (2.6 km²) to each married couple who would settle and cultivate the land for four years. The act is considered a forerunner of the 1862 Homestead Act.

In 1850 he wrote an address to Congress urging the prohibition of free African-Americans from the Oregon Territory, in which said:

[It] is a question of life or death to us in Oregon. The negroes associate with the Indians and intermarry, and, if their free ingress is encouraged or allowed, there would a relationship spring up between them and the different tribes, and a mixed race would ensure inimical to the whites; and the Indians being led on by the negro who is better acquainted with the customs, language, and manners of the whites, than the Indian, these savages would become much more formidable than they otherwise would, and long bloody wars would be the fruits of the comingling of the races. It is the principle of self preservation that justifies the actions of the Oregon legislature.

Death and legacy
While returning to Oregon via Panama, Thurston died of the effects of a tropical fever off Acapulco, Mexico while aboard the steamer California. According to a contemporary obituary:

He died on the 9th [of April 1851] ... eight days from Panama ... His arduous labors at Washington had prepared his system for an attack of the malignant fever incident to the Isthmus, from the effects of which he had not recovered before experiencing a severe attack of diarrhea, which, together with an affection of the liver, under which he had sometime labored, terminated his earthly existence.

Thurston's body was originally interred in Acapulco, but his remains were brought to Oregon two years later by an act of the Oregon Legislature. His body was reburied in the Salem Pioneer Cemetery in Salem. The inscription reads: "Here rests Oregon's first delegate, a man of genius and learning. A lawyer and statesman. His devotions equaled his wide philanthropy, his public acts are his best eulogium."

Thurston County, Washington, originally part of the Oregon Territory and now home of Olympia the capital of Washington, was named in his honor.

References

External links

Clatsop-Nehalem Tribes history

1816 births
1851 deaths
19th-century American lawyers
19th-century American politicians
Bowdoin College alumni
Burials at Salem Pioneer Cemetery
Dartmouth College alumni
Delegates to the United States House of Representatives from Oregon Territory
Lawyers from Hillsboro, Oregon
Members of the Provisional Government of Oregon
Oregon Democrats
Oregon pioneers
People from Monmouth, Maine
People from Peru, Maine
People who died at sea
Politicians from Hillsboro, Oregon